Guðmundur Rúnar Júlíusson (13 April 1945 – 5 December 2008), alternate names: Rúnar Júlíusson or Rúni Júl, was an Icelandic pop singer, music producer and footballer from Keflavík.

Football career
Rúnar was a member of Keflavík ÍF's first national championship in 1964. The same year he was selected to the Icelandic national team but missed its games against Wales due to a musical tour with his band Hljómar.

Death
Rúnar died on 5 December 2008, after suffering a heart attack when he was about to go on stage during a performance in his hometown Keflavík.

References

1945 births
2008 deaths
Rúnar Júlíusson
Rúnar Júlíusson